The Logie Awards (officially the TV Week Logie Awards; colloquially known as The Logies) is an annual gathering to celebrate Australian television, sponsored and organised by the magazine TV Week. The first ceremony was held in 1959 as the TV Week Awards. Awards are presented in twenty categories, representing both public and industry voted prizes.

The Gold Logie is the most prestigious award and the industry's highest honour; it's awarded to the Most Popular Personality on Australian Television for the previous year. The award receives much publicity and media attention.

The event has been strongly associated with the Nine Network, who have hosted the ceremony on the most occasions, and TV and former radio personality Bert Newton, particularly in the early days, who served as a solo host of the ceremony on 17 occasions, with a constant run from 1966 until 1980 and as co-host on three other occasions. Over the years, the Logies have been hosted in Melbourne and Sydney. From 2018 to 2022, the ceremony was held in new locations in the Gold Coast, Queensland.

History
Known from their inception as the TV Week Awards, the awards were instigated by TV Week magazine with the first voting coupons provided in the magazine in late 1958, two years after the introduction of television in Australia. The first awards were presented on 15 January 1959 on an episode of In Melbourne Tonight. Only Melbourne television personalities were nominated and awards were given in eight categories, including two for American programs.

The most prestigious award in 1959 was Star of the Year presented to IMT host Graham Kennedy. The following year, Kennedy coined the name Logie Awards, to honour the Scottish engineer and innovator who contributed to the development of television as a practical medium, John Logie Baird.

The Logie statuette was designed by Alec De Lacy, chief designer for Melbourne-based trophy makers KG Luke Ltd. The first Gold Logie, the equivalent of the Star of the Year Award, was presented in 1960, and again won by Graham Kennedy. The record for most "Gold Logie" wins—at five apiece—is a tie between Kennedy and Ray Martin.

The 2020 and 2021 ceremonies were cancelled due to the COVID-19 pandemic.

Logie institutions and milestones
{|class="wikitable"
| Year
| Event
|-
| 1960 
| The ceremony, instituted the previous year as the TV Week Star Awards, now officially becomes known as  "Logie Awards", in reference as an honour to TV inventor/engineer John Logie Baird, the name is chosen by entertainer Graham Kennedy, after he won what was known the previous previously year as the  "Star of the Year Award", which itself would be come the Gold Logie.
|-
| 1961
| The awards ceremony IS televised for the first time, with the ABC screening the first half-hour of the awards in Sydney.
|-
| 1962
| Australian variety presenter, singer and actress Lorrae Desmond, later best known for her role in serial  A Country Practice, becomes the first female star to win a Gold Logie, for her music variety program The Lorrae Desmond Show.
|-
| 1963
| The planned televised ceremony was cancelled due to the intended host, Tony Hancock cancelling a trip to Australia.
|-
| 1968
| There was no award for the Most Popular Female in Television. According to Bert Newton, who was hosting that year, "it appears no one was deemed worthy enough to receive it".  He pleaded with the producers to never be put in that position again.
|-
| 1973
| The media was invited for the first time to attend the Logies.
|-
| 1974
| Number 96 star Pat McDonald became the first "soap star" actress (not television personality) to win the Gold Logie.
|-
| 1975
| The Logie Awards are broadcast in colour for the first time.
|-
| 1976
| The first and only fictional character to win a Logie of any kind was Norman Gunston, who won the Gold Logie, with his portrayer Garry McDonald, accepting the award in character.
|-
| 1981
|-
| 1984
| The Hall of Fame Logie was introduced by TV Week, awarded to recognise outstanding and continued contribution to television by an individual or program with the first induction being television pioneer and producer Hector Crawford (see below, under Logie Hall of Fame).
|-
| 1988
| Actress and future international pop star Kylie Minogue became the youngest person to win a Gold Logie, aged 19 for her role as Charlene Robinson in soap opera 'Neighbours.
|-
| 1989
| The Seven Network screens the Logie Awards for the first time.
|-
|  1997
| Agro's Cartoon Connection won its seventh consecutive Logie Award for Most Popular Children's Program, ending the longest undefeated streak of the Logies of either show or person.
|-
| 2010
| Actor Ray Meagher became the oldest person to win an award, at age 66, for his portrayal of Alf Stewart in Home and Away.
|-
| 2006
| A new Logies category was introduced, named the Graham Kennedy Award for Most Outstanding Newcomer, to honour Kennedy's career and legacy and to commemorate the 50th year of continued broadcasting of television in Australia.
|-
| 2016
| The Logies accepted for the first time nominations from locally produced digital content. Also in 2016, presenter Waleed Aly (whose parents where born in Egypt) became the first non-Caucasian person to win the Gold Logie.
|-
| 2017
| TV Week announced that after 30 years, the awards ceremony will no longer be held in Melbourne, due to the withdrawal of financial support by the Victorian government. The Logie awards ceremony will be instead held at The Star Gold Coast on the Gold Coast, Queensland for four years, with support of the Queensland Government.
 
The decade of the 2010s was the first decade where no one won the Gold Logie award more than once.
|-
| 2020
| It was announced on the 29 April that the Logie Awards scheduled for 28 June 2020, were being cancelled outright prior to any voting or nominations taking place, due to the COVID-19 pandemic. The ceremony was set to return on 28 November 2021, but was again cancelled on 4 September 2021. It has been confirmed that it will now take place on 19 June 2022.
|-
| 2022
| The Logie Award for Most Popular Presenter is renamed as the Bert Newton Award for Most Popular Presenter, in tribute to Bert Newton, a television personality and presenter who was a Hall of Fame inductee.
|-
|}

Logies Hall of Fame
The prestigious Logie Hall of Fame was first introduced in 1984; former conductor, turned television producer and pioneer and founder of Crawford Productions, Hector Crawford was the first inductee. The induction was a posthumous honour for TV cameraman Neil Davis, actor Maurie Fields, conservationist Steve Irwin, news anchor Brian Naylor and journalist Peter Harvey.

Kerri-Anne Kennerley was only the third woman to be inducted after Ruth Cracknell and Noni Hazlehurst.  It has been criticised for its lack of women.

TV programs

These are the only programs that have been inducted into the Hall of Fame.

Nomination and voting procedures
Public voting
Voting for the Most Popular Logie categories is done using an online form, or by SMS (short message service) voting for the final nominees. Ten of the Logie Award categories are fan awards. In the past, the "Most Popular" Logies categories were voted by the readers of TV Week magazine using a coupon.

SMS (short message service) voting was introduced in 2006 for the Gold Logie. In 2008, Internet votes could be cast for the first time without having to buy a copy of the TV Week magazine.

Before 2018, public voting usually lasted for four weeks, beginning in December or January, while the ceremony itself was in late April or early May. Since 2018, voting begins in March and the ceremony is held in July.

Industry voting
The Most Outstanding categories are voted on by a jury comprising members of the Australian TV industry peers. There were 15 categories in the industry awards at the Logie Awards of 2018.

Eligibility
To be eligible to receive a Logie, a program must be Australian produced, set in Australia and have a predominantly Australian cast. Although in other years there has been a Logie for overseas programs, these awards are no longer part of the awards. People eligible for a Logie must have appeared on an Australian-produced show that was broadcast on Australian television in the previous year.

There are long-held suspicions that network publicists engage in mass voting to rig the results. However, no hard evidence had emerged for this, other than the experiment by the satirical newspaper The Chaser, who attempted to have low-profile SBS newsreader Anton Enus nominated for the Gold Logie. They did so by getting their small readership to buy copies of TV Week and vote for Enus for the award. While the attempt failed (they came "reasonably close", to earning a nomination for Enus, according to a "TV Week Insider"), their failure gives some cause for the widespread derision in the industry (particularly the 'quality' end) towards the popular-vote awards.

Community television, Channel 31, personalities and shows are eligible for nomination for Logies, however since their audiences are far smaller than those of the commercial channels and public broadcasters, they are at a tremendous disadvantage. For a time they had their own community television awards, known as the Antenna Awards. Despite this, in 2009 the Logies were dogged by minor controversy after organisers refused to allow an acclaimed community television show, The Bazura Project, to be nominated in the category of Outstanding Comedy Show, stating "As TV Week does not cover community television within the magazine, we are unable to consider individual programs on this platform." The ABC's Media Watch program first reported the story on Monday 9 March 2009, with many media outlets covering the growing support for the community television program since.

 Logies ceremonies by year 

Awards ceremony
The Logie Awards ceremony is televised and became generally more elaborate as years went by. The awards have mostly been held in a ballroom, rather than a theatre, which is common for the Emmy Awards and Academy Awards. Dinner is served just before the ceremony and drinks are served during the ceremony.

Bert Newton, who has won the Gold Logie four times, hosted the awards a total of 19 times. GTV-9/Nine Network is also strongly associated with the history of the Logies. Nine has hosted the awards 46 times in their 60-year history.

The Seven Network will take over from the Nine Network as host broadcaster.Logies 2023 to be broadcast on Channel 7 and 7plus Seven Network 13 September 2022 Seven had last broadcast the Logie Awards in 1995.Logies making the switch to Seven for first time in 28 years Sydney Morning Herald 13 September 2022

Controversies
In 1973, American actor Michael Cole generated controversy after accepting an award while apparently drunk, uttering the word "shit" in a short, incoherent acceptance speech. This was the first time such profanity had been said on Australian television. According to Bert Newton, Channel Nine received thousands of complaints about the use of the word, however, when it was edited for the repeat transmission Newton stated "they got double the calls complaining it had been dropped."

In 1979, during a notable appearance with Muhammad Ali as co-presenter, Newton made a comment "I like the boy!" (in reference to a series of TV advertisements Bert had recently done). Ali became upset at the comment, as the term "boy" carried negative racial connotations for many black Americans, although Newton was oblivious to this use of the term and claimed this was not his intention. After realising his faux pas, Newton quickly apologised to Ali on stage.

The most difficult guest to interact with, according to Newton, was Vic Morrow in 1967.  He would just stand there saying nothing, silently handing out the Logies.  According to Bert, "every so often, I'd say 'how are you going, Vic?' and he would just nod his head."

Grant Denyer's 2018 Gold Logie win has proved controversial with people believing he only won because of Tom Gleeson's campaign. Gleeson has shrugged off those suggestions.

Tom Gleeson's 2019 Gold Logie win has proved controversial with him not being so humble by the victory.

The trial of the man accused of raping Brittany Higgins was delayed because of comments from Lisa Wilkinson's acceptance speech.

Every year before public voting opens, major commercial networks ABC, SBS, Seven, Nine, and 10 are restricted in the number of personalities and programs they can submit for consideration in the publicly voted category, including up to 10 names in both the Most Popular Actor and Actress categories, 15 names for Most Popular Presenter and five programs for Most Popular Drama. These restrictions often are introduced over those who are not listed in the voting form, and as a result, they are not eligible to be nominated for an award.

Live performers
Many local and overseas performers have appeared at the Logie Awards ceremony. While it had been a tradition to choose performers with a television connection, this has not always been the case.

In 2001, Ricky Martin was the headline performer. In 2002, Destiny's Child performed, with Elton John and Shakira making appearances. In 2004, it was Michael Bublé with Delta Goodrem. In 2011, Katy Perry performed and presented an award, while 2012 saw One Direction and Delta Goodrem perform on the night with appearances from Flo Rida, Tony Bennett and Seal. In 2013, it was Bruno Mars and 2014 Ed Sheeran.

Award categories
Public voted categories
Gold Logie
 Gold Logie Award for Most Popular Personality on Australian Television

Silver Logie
 Most Popular Actor
 Most Popular Actress
 Bert Newton Award for Most Popular Presenter
 Graham Kennedy Award for Most Popular New Talent

Program awards
 Most Popular Drama Program
 Most Popular Comedy Program 
 Most Popular Entertainment Program
 Most Popular Reality Program
 Most Popular Lifestyle Program
 Most Popular Panel or Current Affairs Program

Industry voted categories
Gold Logie
 Logie Hall of Fame

Silver Logie
 Most Outstanding Actor
 Most Outstanding Actress
 Most Outstanding Supporting Actor
 Most Outstanding Supporting Actress
 Most Outstanding Drama Series
 Most Outstanding Miniseries or Telemovie
 Most Outstanding Children's Program
 Most Outstanding Factual or Documentary Program
 Most Outstanding Entertainment Program 
 Most Outstanding Reality Program
 Most Outstanding News Coverage or Public Affairs Report
 Most Outstanding Sports Coverage

Former categories
 Most Outstanding Comedy Program
 Best Australian Drama (1961–1976)
 Best Variety Show (1961–??)
 Most Popular Variety Program
 Most Popular Children's Program
 Most Popular Australian Program (1961–2004)
 Most Popular Factual Program (until 2017)
 Most Popular Live Show (1966–1967)
 Most Popular Game Show (2002)
 Best Commercial (1962–1976)
 Most Popular Overseas Program (2003, 2005)
 Most Popular Overseas Drama (2004)
 Most Popular Overseas Comedy (2004)
 Most Popular Comedy Personality
 Most Popular Light Entertainment Personality
 Most Outstanding Sportscaster
 Most Popular Sports Event
 Most Popular Sports Program (until 2017)
 Most Popular Telemovie or Miniseries
 Most Outstanding Public Affairs Report
 Most Outstanding News Coverage
 Most Outstanding Current Affairs Program 
 Best News Panel or Current Affairs Program (2016–2017)
 Most Popular Public Affairs Program
 Most Outstanding News or Public Affairs Broadcaster
 George Wallace Memorial Logie for Best New Talent (1969–1977)
 Graham Kennedy Award for Most Outstanding Newcomer (2006–2017)
 Most Popular New Male Talent (1999–2013)
 Most Popular New Female Talent (1999–2013)
 Most Popular Commercial

Most wins
Programs
As of 2017, Home and Away is the most successful program in Logies history, having won 46 awards since it premiered in 1988. Neighbours is the second most successful having won 31 Logies since it began in 1985. A Country Practice follows as the third most successful program, having won 29 awards throughout its twelve-year run. Blue Heelers is fourth with 25 Logies.

People
Television personalities with the most national wins (excluding state-based Logie awards) are:

Actors/actresses with the most national wins:

See also

 Antenna Awards
 ASTRA Awards
 List of television awards

References
 Citations 

 General and cited references 
 Chris Taylor, 17 May 2003, "The Insider", Sydney Morning Herald'' – article describing the Logies, as well as a comic attempt to rig the Gold Logie voting process
 IMDB page on the Logie Awards

External links

 
 The History of Australian Television—The Logies
 Archived list of Logie Awards

 
1959 establishments in Australia
Australian comedy awards
Awards established in 1959
Nine Network specials
Television shows set in Gold Coast, Queensland
Television shows set in Melbourne